The 2010–11 UNLV Runnin' Rebels basketball team represented the University of Nevada, Las Vegas. The team was coached by Lon Kruger, returning for his seventh year with the Runnin' Rebels. They played their home games at the Thomas & Mack Center on UNLV's main campus in Paradise, Nevada and are a member of the Mountain West Conference. They finished the season 24–9, 11–5 in Mountain West play and lost in the semifinals of the 2011 Mountain West Conference men's basketball tournament to San Diego State. They received an at-large bid in the 2011 NCAA Division I men's basketball tournament where they lost in the second round to Illinois.

Roster

Offseason 
UNLV finished the 2009–2010 season with a 25–9 record, losing to Northern Iowa in the  first round of the 2010 NCAA Division I men's basketball tournament, 69–66. About a month later, it was announced that power forward Matt Shaw would be ineligible for his senior season because he tested positive for a banned substance. On July 6, Head Coach Lon Kruger announced that Mike Moser has transferred from UCLA. On September 1, Kruger announced that Kendall Wallace will undergo knee surgery due to a torn ACL and will miss the entire season. Four weeks later, senior guard Tre'Von Willis was suspended for at least 10% of the season due to a June 29 arrested by the Henderson Police Department. He was charged with domestic battery and was also sentenced to a 100 hours of community service and was charged with a $325 fine. Their offseason ended with their first practice on October 18, 2010.

Preview 
The Runnin' Rebels were picked to finish fourth in the Mountain West Conference, behind defending conference tournament champion San Diego State Aztecs, the BYU Cougars led by preseason player of the year (Jimmer Fredette) and defending regular season champion, the New Mexico Lobos. Wills was also named to the preseason All-Team. UNLV received a first-place vote and 203 points.

Rankings

Schedule and results 

|-
!colspan=9 style=| Exhibition

|-
!colspan=9 style=| Regular season

|-
!colspan=9 style=| Mountain West tournament

|-
!colspan=9 style=|NCAA tournament

See also 
 2010–11 NCAA Division I men's basketball season
 2010–11 NCAA Division I men's basketball rankings

References 

UNLV
UNLV Runnin' Rebels basketball seasons
UNLV
Run
Run